The 1999 Tour de Pologne was the 56th edition of the Tour de Pologne cycle race and was held from 6 September to 12 September 1999. The race started in Elbląg and finished in Karpacz. The race was won by Tomasz Brożyna.

General classification

References

1999
Tour de Pologne
Tour de Pologne